Dombivli Nagari Sahakari Bank Ltd. (DNS BANK) is the Multi-State Scheduled  Bank located in the Thane District, state of Maharashtra established on 6 September 1970. Having their Head office in Dombivli, Thane District. Currently DNS Bank has 65 branches across 12 districts in state of Maharashtra.

Dombivli Nagari Sahakari Bank Ltd. got Scheduled status in the year 1996. In year 2006 this bank implemented Core Banking Services. 
DNS Bank is 1st Co-operative Bank  to launch Mobile Banking Services in India. DNS Bank has adapted new technology.

Dombivli Nagari Sahakari Bank fall under Scheduled Urban Cooperative Banks in India and it regulatory body is Reserve Bank of India. Dombivli Nagari Sahakari Bank is one of the banks where Core Banking Solution (CBS) is in operation.

Dombivli Nagari Sahakari Bank is Live on Unified Payments Interface (UPI).

References

Cooperatives in Maharashtra
Cooperative banks of India
Economy of Thane
Kalyan-Dombivli
1970 establishments in Maharashtra
Banks established in 1970
Indian companies established in 1970
Banks based in Maharashtra